This article contains information about the literary events and publications of 1883.

Events

January 13 – Henrik Ibsen's play An Enemy of the People (En folkefiende, 1882) gains its first performance at the Christiania Theatre.
February – Carlo Collodi's children's story The Adventures of Pinocchio appears first in Italy complete in book form as Le avventure di Pinocchio.
May 23 – Robert Louis Stevenson's children's pirate adventure novel Treasure Island first appears in book form from Cassell in London.
June – Footlights, the University of Cambridge drama club in England, gives its first performance.
June 4 – Mihai Eminescu reads his nationalist poem Doina to an enthusiastic crowd at Junimea in Iași. It is sometimes described as his last work before a mental breakdown later this year. Eminescu's host Ion Creangă recalls it being composed on the spot, but some researchers date it back to 1870.
June 30–October 20 – Robert Louis Stevenson's novel The Black Arrow: A Tale of Tunstall Forest is serialized in the British magazine Young Folks as by "Captain George North". Stevenson completes writing it at the end of the summer in France.
July – The first issue of Fiamuri Arbërit, an Albanian literary and political magazine, is published from Cosenza. Managed by Girolamo de Rada, it promotes Ottomanism against Philhellenism.
August – Ivan Turgenev dictates his last story, "An end", to Pauline Viardot (who writes it in French) on his deathbed at Bougival in France.
August 29 – Dunfermline Carnegie Library, the first Carnegie library, opens in Andrew Carnegie's home town, Dunfermline, Scotland.
October 3–9 – Turgenev's body is returned by train from Paris to Saint Petersburg with crowds turning out to honor him.
December 27–28 – The Modern Language Association of America holds its first meeting.
Uncertain dates
Mark Twain's memoirs Life on the Mississippi are published simultaneously in Boston (Massachusetts) and London, as the first major book submitted to a publisher in typescript.
Kisari Mohan Ganguli begins publication of the first English-language translation of the Mahabharata.
The Deutsches Theater company is formed in Berlin.

New books

Fiction
Emilia Pardo Bazán – La tribuna
Mary Elizabeth Braddon – Phantom Fortune
Rhoda Broughton – Belinda
Hugh Conway – Called Back
Wilkie Collins – Heart and Science
Anne Elliot – Dr. Edith Romney
Ludwig Ganghofer – The Hunter of Fall
Auguste Villiers de l'Isle-Adam – Contes cruels
John Hay – The Bread-Winners (anonymous serialization in The Century Magazine)
Alexander Kielland – Poison (Gift)
Jonas Lie – Familien paa Gilje (The Gilje family)
John Macnie (as Ismar Thiusen) – The Diothas; or, A Far Look Ahead
Mary E. Mann – The Parish of Hilby
Guy de Maupassant – Une Vie
George A. Moore  – A Modern Lover
Friedrich Nietzsche – Thus Spoke Zarathustra (Also sprach Zarathustra, publication begins)
Sir Thomas Wemyss Reid – Gladys Fane
Charlotte Riddell – A Struggle for Fame
Annie S. Swan – Aldersyde
Giovanni Verga – Novelle rusticane (Rustic short stories, about Sicily)
Jules Verne – Kéraban the Inflexible (Kéraban-le-têtu)

Children and young people
Carlo Collodi – The Adventures of Pinocchio (Le avventure di Pinocchio)
George MacDonald – The Princess and Curdie
Howard Pyle – The Merry Adventures of Robin Hood
Robert Louis Stevenson – Treasure Island (book publication)

Drama
Frances Hodgson Burnett and William Gillette – Esmeralda
François Coppée – Severo Torelli
Imre Madách – The Tragedy of Man (Az ember tragédiája, first performed)
Edward Rose – Vice Versa
George Robert Sims – In the Ranks
August Strindberg – Lycko-Pers resa (Lucky Peter's Travels or Lucky Pehr)
Oscar Wilde – Vera; or, The Nihilists (first performed)
William Young – The Rajah; or Wyncot's Ward

Poetry

Non-fiction
Mathilde Blind – George Eliot
Hall Caine – Cobwebs of Criticism
Thomas Hill Green (died 1882) – Prolegomena to Ethics
J.-K. Huysmans – L'Art moderne
Agnes Catherine Maitland (as A. C. M., Examiner...) – The Rudiments of Cookery: a Manual for Use in Schools and Homes
William Robinson – The English Flower Garden
J. R. Seeley – The Expansion of England
Alfred Percy Sinnett – Esoteric Buddhism
John Addington Symonds – A Problem in Greek Ethics: an inquiry into the phenomenon of sexual inversion, addressed especially to medical psychologists and jurists
Mark Twain – Life on the Mississippi

Births
January 1 – Alberto Gerchunoff, Argentine writer (died 1949)
January 6 – Kahlil Gibran, Lebanese-born poet and novelist writing in Arabic and English (died 1931)
January 10 – Aleksei Tolstoy, Russian writer (died 1945)
January 20 – Forrest Wilson, American journalist and author (died 1942)
January 21 – Olav Aukrust, Norwegian poet and teacher (died 1929)
February 8 – Joseph Schumpeter, Austrian/American political economist (died 1950)
February 15 – Sax Rohmer (Arthur Henry Ward), English novelist (died 1959)
February 20 – Naoya Shiga, Japanese novelist (died 1971)
March 2 (February 18 O.S.) – Nikos Kazantzakis, Greek novelist (died 1957)
March 9 – Umberto Saba, Italian poet and novelist (died 1957)
March 17 – Urmuz, Romanian short prose writer (died 1923)
March 27 (March 15 O.S.) – Marie Under, Estonian poet (died 1980)
April 18 – Aleksanteri Aava, Finnish poet (died 1956)
April 30 – Jaroslav Hašek, Czech novelist (died 1923)
June 3 – Franz Kafka, Czech novelist writing in German (died 1924)
June 4 – Joseph Jefferson Farjeon, English crime writer (died 1955)
July 29 – Porfirio Barba-Jacob, Colombian writer (died 1942)
September 14 – Rose Combe, French writer and railway worker (died 1932)
 September 22 – Ferenc Oslay, Hungarian-Slovene historian, writer and irredenta (died 1932)
 October 18 – Helena Boguszewska, Polish writer, columnist and a social activist (died 1978)
December 13 – Belle da Costa Greene, American librarian (died 1950)
December 23 – Yoshishige Abe, Japanese philosopher and politician (died 1966)
December 30 – Marie Gevers, Belgian novelist writing in French (died 1975)
unknown date – May Edginton, English popular novelist (died 1957)

Deaths
January 21 – Anna Eliza Bray, English novelist and travel writer (born 1790)
March 14 – Karl Marx, German philosopher (born 1818)
April 24 – Jules Sandeau, French novelist (born 1811)
May 15 – Mary Elizabeth Mohl ("Clarkey"), English-born literary salonnière (born 1793)
May 23 – Cyprian Norwid, Polish poet, dramatist and artist (born 1821)
June 20 – Gustave Aimard, French novelist (born 1818)
June 11 – Caroline Leigh Gascoigne, English poet, novelist, short story writer (born 1813)
July 16 – Edward Backhouse Eastwick, Anglo-Indian orientalist and translator (born 1814)
August 31 – Levin Schücking, German novelist (born 1814)
September 2 – Léon Halévy, French historian and dramatist (born 1802)
September 3 – Ivan Turgenev, Russian novelist (born 1818)
September 10 – Hendrik Conscience, Flemish novelist (born 1812)
September 25 – George Ayliffe Poole, English writer and cleric (born 1809)
November 26 – Sojourner Truth, African American abolitionist, women's rights activist, and author (born 1797)
December 13 – Victor de Laprade, French poet and critic (born 1812)

References

1883 books
Years of the 19th century in literature